Zinc finger protein 300 is a protein that in humans is encoded by the ZNF300 gene. The protein encoded by this gene is a C2H2-type zinc finger DNA binding protein and a likely transcription factor.

It is antisense to the human gene, C16orf71, indicating possibility of regulated alternative expression.

Clinical relevance
It is associated with Crohn's disease.

References

Further reading

Transcription factors